Darryl Gibson may refer to:

Darryl Gibson (lacrosse) (born 1976), Canadian-born professional lacrosse player
Real name of American rapper Positive K

See also
Daryl Gibson (born 1975), New Zealand rugby union footballer